Garrett County Public Schools is a U.S. school district headquartered in Oakland, Maryland. It serves Garrett County, Maryland.

Schools
High schools:
 Northern Garrett High School
 Southern Garrett High School

K-8 schools:
 Swan Meadow

Middle schools:
 Northern Middle School
 Southern Middle School

Elementary schools:
 Accident Elementary School
 Broad Ford Elementary School
 Crellin Elementary School
 Friendsville Elementary School
 Grantsville Elementary School
 Route 40 Elementary School
 Yough Glades Elementary School

Other facilities:
 Hickory Environmental Education Center

References

External links
 Garrett County Public Schools

School districts in Maryland
Education in Garrett County, Maryland